Kheeston Randall (born May 7, 1990) is a former American football defensive tackle who played professionally for the Miami Dolphins, Cincinnati Bengals and Minnesota Vikings. Prior to that he played college football for the Texas Longhorns.

Early life
Randall was born in Beaumont, Texas and played high school football at Monsignor Kelly Catholic High School under assistant coach Frank Middleton, former NFL offensive guard. Randall was two-time all-state and led the team to a 9-1 record and a berth in the regional finals. He also played basketball and threw the shot put.

College career
Randall attended the University of Texas at Austin from 2008 to 2011. During his career he started 35 of 47 games, recording 98 tackles and four sacks.  During his freshman year, he saw play in eight games, but by his sophomore year he'd emerged as a starter, starting 10 games including the BCS Championship game against #1 Alabama. He started all 25 games during the 2010-2011 seasons. In 2010, he recorded five tackles for losses, 34 tackles, eight quarterback hurries and one sack and was named honorable mention All-Big 12. In 2011, he recorded 21 tackles for losses, 98 tackles (49 solo) and four sacks and was named first-team All-Big 12.

Professional career

Miami Dolphins
Randall was drafted by the Miami Dolphins in the seventh round of the 2012 NFL Draft. Randall played 12 games in 2012 but Miami released him before the start of the 2013 season.

Cincinnati Bengals
The Cincinnati Bengals signed Randall on November 5, 2013 to shore up depth following Geno Atkins' injury, but remained on the roster for only two weeks before being released.

Minnesota Vikings
In January 2014, Randall was signed by his former Defensive Coordinator, Mike Zimmer, to play for the Minnesota Vikings just one week after Zimmer took over as the head coach. He was released on August 25, 2014 before the start of the season.

References

External links
 
Texas Longhorns bio
The Daily Texas: Kheeston Randall is ready for next level

1989 births
Living people
American football defensive ends
American football defensive tackles
Cincinnati Bengals players
Miami Dolphins players
Minnesota Vikings players
Players of American football from Texas
Sportspeople from Beaumont, Texas
Texas Longhorns football players